The Critics' Choice Documentary Awards are accolades that are presented by the Critics Choice Association to honour the finest achievements in documentary filmmaking and non-fiction television. They were established in 2016, and the first ceremony was held on November 3, 2016.

Categories

Current categories
For the latest ceremony, the following categories were presented:
 Best Documentary Feature
 Best Director
 Best First Documentary Feature
 Best Narration
 Best Archival Documentary
 Best Short Documentary
 Best Political Documentary
 Best Sports Documentary
 Best Historical/Biographical Documentary
 Best Science/Nature Documentary
 Best Music Documentary
 Best Score
 Best Editing
 Best Cinematography
 Most Compelling Living Subjects of a Documentary

Discontinued categories
Other categories previously presented include:
 Best Limited Documentary Series
 Best Ongoing Documentary Series
 Best Song in a Documentary
 Most Innovative Documentary
 Landmark Award
 D.A. Pennebaker Award (formerly known as the Lifetime Award)

Ceremonies
The following is a listing of all Critics' Choice Documentary Awards ceremonies since 2016.

See also
Critics' Choice Movie Award for Best Documentary Feature
Academy Award for Best Documentary Feature

External links
Official website

References

Awards established in 2016
Broadcast Film Critics Association Awards
American documentary film awards